Agnolo Monosini (Pratovecchio 1568 – Florence 1626) was an Italian scholar and cleric of the 16th and 17th centuries, who played a key role in the development of the Italian language two hundred years prior to the risorgimento.

He was a native of Pratovecchio and studied with the Accademia della Crusca in Florence, where he contributed to its first Vocabolario della lingua italiana, published in 1623, in particular adding an index of Greek words.

A passion for words
Monosini had one craze which consumed all his intellectual energies:  that of proving the Greek origins of the Florentine idiom, which would one day develop into modern Italian. He was reacting to French writers of the period who took great pains to relate their own language directly with Ancient Greek, bypassing the inheritance of Latin and Italian and Alpine Humanism.

The relationships that Monosini develops between Greek and his contemporary vernacular rather suffer from his unconditional enthusiasm, with the result that the associations proposed are often cumbersome and sometimes quite bizarre.

Floris Italicae 
In his key work, Floris Italicae linguae libri novem (The Flower of Italian Language in a nine books) published in 1604, he collected many vernacular Italian proverbs and idioms, and compared and contrasted them with Greek and Latin.

Floris Italicae particularly concentrated on proverbs and language from Tuscany and the high Maremma, and thus included many aspects of the ‘vulgar’ vernacular language which were to become part of the official Italian language at the time of the Risorgimento.

Floris Italicae was re-published in 2011, with a companion volume of etymology and proverbs from the period.

Notes

External links 
 Treccani Encyclopedia entry
 Italian language article and book review
 Entry in website of re-publisher Vecchiarelli Editore
 Virtual library of the La Crusca Academy (registration required)

Linguists from Italy
1568 births
1626 deaths